Black Magic Woman is a compilation album by British blues rock band Fleetwood Mac, released in 1971. It is a double album, composed of songs from two Peter Green-era albums, Peter Green's Fleetwood Mac and English Rose, as well as several non-album tracks. The U.S. Epic double album contains a different cover photo of a gypsy woman.

Track listing

Credits
Peter Green – vocals, guitar, harmonica
Jeremy Spencer – vocals, slide guitar
Danny Kirwan – vocals, electric guitar
John McVie – bass guitar
Mick Fleetwood – drums

References

External links 
 Black Magic Woman at The Penguin discography

Albums produced by Mike Vernon (record producer)
Fleetwood Mac compilation albums
1971 compilation albums
Columbia Records compilation albums
Epic Records compilation albums
Blue Horizon Records compilation albums